Aromas is a commune in the Jura department in the region of Bourgogne-Franche-Comté in eastern France. On 1 January 2017, the former commune of Villeneuve-lès-Charnod was merged into Aromas.

Population

See also
Communes of the Jura department

References

Communes of Jura (department)